Manik Sarkar (born 22 January 1949) is an Indian communist politician who served as the Chief Minister of Tripura from March 1998 to March 2018. He is a Politburo member of the Communist Party of India (Marxist). In March 2008, he was sworn in as leader of Left Front, the Tripura coalition government. In assembly elections held in 2013, he became the chief minister for the fourth consecutive time. He served as the Leader of the Opposition in the Tripura Legislative Assembly from 2018 to 2023.

His affidavit for the 2018 Tripura Assembly election revealed that he is the chief minister with the least possessions among all his counterparts in India.

Early life and background

Manik Sarkar was born into a middle-class family. His father, Amulya Sarkar, worked as a tailor, while his mother, Anjali Sarkar, was a State and later Provincial government employee. Sarkar became active in student movements in his student days, and in 1968, at the age of 19, he became a member of the Communist Party of India (Marxist). He was a candidate of the Students' Federation of India throughout his academic life at MBB College, from where he graduated with a B. Com. degree. During his first year at the college there came the turbulent times of the food movement of 1967, campaigning against the policy of the then Congress government of Tripura, and Sarkar threw himself headlong into the related student struggle. His vigorous role in this mass movement led him to join the Communists. Due to his early political exposure, he also became the General Secretary of the MBB College Student Union and was also made the Vice President of the Students' Federation of India. In 1972, at the early age of 23, he joined the State Committee of the Communist Party of India (Marxist).

Political career

Six years after being selected in the CPI (M) State Committee, Sarkar was included in the party state secretariat in the year 1978. This was also the year when the first Left Front government had taken control in Tripura.

In 1980, at the age of 31, he was elected as the Member of the Legislative Assembly from the Agartala constituency. This was the start of Manik Sarkar's leadership in his state. At around the same time, he was appointed the Chief Whip of the CPI (M). His success as the Member of the Legislative Assembly returned in 1983, when he was elected to the Assembly from Krishnanagar, Agartala. When the Left Front government took control in 1993, Sarkar was appointed the State Secretary of the CPI (M).

The biggest success came to Sarkar in 1998. At the age of 49, he became a member of the Politburo of the CPI (M), which is the principal policy-making and executive committee in a Communist party. In the same year, he became the Chief Minister of the state of Tripura. Since then, he was elected to the same position four consecutive times in 20 years. He is one of the very few chief Ministers in India who was in the office for so long. His party lost majority in the 2018 elections and he had to step down as a result.

It was noted that Sarkar will not contest the 2023 elections. He revealed that he had done so in order to pave way for younger leadership.

Personal life
Sarkar is married to Panchali Bhattacharya, who was employed with the Central Social Welfare Board till she retired in 2011. He chooses to live in an old and a very small house that belonged to his great grandfather. He used to donate his entire salary that he received as a Chief Minister to his party and in return, got  10,000 (approximately US$155) per month as allowance.

Controversy 

 According to Tripura education minister Ratan Lal Nath, former chief minister Manik Sarkar genuinely took on the role of a whistleblower in the Rs 640 crore PWD fraud investigation that resulted in the indictment of numerous officials including former PWD minister Badal Choudhury.

See also 
 Manik Sarkar ministry (2013–2018)

References

External links

 

1949 births
Living people
Bengali people
Communist Party of India (Marxist) politicians from Tripura
Tripura politicians
Chief Ministers of Tripura
University of Calcutta alumni
People from Gomati district
Chief ministers from Communist Party of India (Marxist)
Tripura MLAs 2018–2023
Leaders of the Opposition in Tripura
Tripura MLAs 2008–2013
Tripura MLAs 2013–2018
MBB College alumni